Richmondshire District Council is the local authority for Richmondshire in North Yorkshire, England, and is elected every four years. Since the last boundary changes in 2003, 34 councillors have been elected from 24 wards.

Political control
Since the first election to the council in 1973 political control of the council has been held by the following parties:

Leadership
The leaders of the council since 2001 have been:

Council elections
Summary of the council composition after recent council elections, click on the year for full details of each election. Boundary changes took place for the 2003 election.

1973 Richmondshire District Council election
1976 Richmondshire District Council election
1979 Richmondshire District Council election (New ward boundaries)
1983 Richmondshire District Council election
1987 Richmondshire District Council election

District result maps

By-election results
By-elections occur when seats become vacant between council elections. Below is a summary of recent by-elections; full by-election results can be found by clicking on the by-election name.

2007-2011

2011-2015
Retirement of District Councillor Lin Clarkson.

Death of Independent Cllr Bob Gale.

2015-2019

Death of Independent Cllr Tony Pelton.

Death of Independent Cllr Richard Beal.

2019-2023
Death of Independent Cllr John Blackie.

References

External links
Richmondshire District Council

 
District council elections in England
Council elections in North Yorkshire